Dzhankoi or Jankoy is a town of regional significance in the northern part of Crimea, internationally recognized as part of Ukraine, but since 2014 occupied by Russia. It also serves as administrative centre of Dzhankoi Raion although it is not a part of the raion (district). Population: 

But it is often explained as meaning 'spirit-village' (< can 'spirit' + köy 'village').

The city has various industries, which produce automobiles, reinforced concrete, fabric, meat, and other products. Dzhankoi also has professional technical schools.

Geography
Dzhankoi serves as the administrative centre of the Dzhankoi Raion. Two railroad lines, Solionoye ozero-Sevastopol and Armiansk-Kerch, cross Dzhankoi.

History
Dzhankoi was mentioned for the first time in 1855, and it received city status in 1926. About 1,400 Jews lived in Dzhankoi on the eve of the Second World War. In 1941, during the war, Dzhankoi was occupied by German troops. During the occupation, 720 Jewish members of the local collective farm were shot in the city. Other accounts mention 7,000, which could include Jews brought from elsewhere. Dzhankoi was recaptured by Soviet troops on April 13, 1944. In 1954, as part of the Crimean region, it became part of the Ukrainian SSR. Since 1991, it has been a part of independent Ukraine. In February 2014, it was annexed by Russia.

Transport
Dzhankoi is a transport hub. Through the city pass two major railways of the peninsula as well as two major European highways. It has two railroad terminals - the central one, where only passenger and fast trains stop and the suburban one - where only suburban trains, known as elektrichkas, are allowed.

Dzhankoi air base of the Russian Navy is nearby.

Population

Demographics 

Climate
Dzhankoi's climate is mostly hot in the summer, and mild in the winter.

In popular culture
Dzhankoi is the subject of a popular Yiddish song "Hey! Zhankoye," as popularized by The Limeliters, Pete Seeger, the Klezmatics, and Theodore Bikel, a Soviet-era song praising the life of Jews on collective farms in Crimea.

Gallery

References

External links
 The murder of the Jews of Dzhankoi during World War II, at Yad Vashem website.

Cities in Crimea
Populated places established in 1926
Cities of regional significance in Ukraine
Populated places established in the Russian Empire
Holocaust locations in Ukraine
1926 establishments in the Soviet Union
Territorial disputes of Ukraine